The 1884–1890 French naval mission to Greece was invited to the country by the government of Charilaos Trikoupis to reorganize the Royal Hellenic Navy, in parallel to a military mission for the Hellenic Army. The naval mission, headed by Rear Admiral , arrived in Greece in December 1884, and remained in the country until 1890. 

Among its major achievements were the establishment of a separate Naval Academy in 1884, administrative and legislative reforms, and the modernization in training and service regulations, including the establishments of a naval training centre at Poros Island and a naval hospital. Under the influence of the French mission, the Greek government engaged in major arms purchases from France: the three new Hydra-class ironclads, as well as the older cruiser Navarchos Miaoulis.

References

Sources 
 

1884 in Greece
1885 in Greece
1886 in Greece
1887 in Greece
1888 in Greece
1889 in Greece
1890 in Greece
History of the French Navy
History of the Hellenic Navy
Naval Mission 1884
History of Greece (1863–1909)
Charilaos Trikoupis